Preobrazhenka is a rural locality (a selo) in Starooskolsky District, Belgorod Oblast, Russia. The population was 124 as of 2010. There are 3 streets.

Geography 
Preobrazhenka is located 58 km southeast of Stary Oskol (the district's administrative centre) by road. Menzhulyuk is the nearest rural locality.

References 

Rural localities in Starooskolsky District